The Mothership Tour was the first tour by the American electronic music artist Skrillex. The tour had 66 shows, 50 in the United States and Canada, and 16 in Europe. The tour was set to include many guest acts such as the Foreign Beggars, Skream, Benga, Nero, 12th Planet, Diplo, Two Fresh, and Nadastrom.

Tour dates

References

Mothership Tour